Bimoba may be,

Bimoba people
Bimoba language